Nygren Point is a rocky point 4 nautical miles (7 km) southeast of Cape Broms, on the southwest side of James Ross Island. First seen and surveyed in 1903 by the Swedish Antarctic Expedition under Nordenskjold, who named it Cape Nygren after G. Nygren, Swedish chemist who contributed toward the cost of the expedition. It was resurveyed by the Falkland Islands Dependencies Survey (FIDS) in 1952. Point is considered a more suitable descriptive term for this feature than cape.

Headlands of James Ross Island